Remington Centre is an upcoming  Chinese-themed mall to be built at the corner of Kennedy Road and Steeles Avenue in Markham, Ontario, Canada, on the site of the former Market Village mall which closed on March 1, 2018. It will be connected to Pacific Mall by an indoor walkway. Market Village was scheduled for demolition and construction of the new mall which should have begun in the third quarter of 2013, but demolition began in October 2018.

The new mall will have a contemporary design and unique features, including light-filled hallways, indoor and outdoor public spaces and signature night market.

In 2009, plans were developed to demolish Market Village and replace it with a larger and modern complex called the Remington Centre. The Remington Centre will aim for LEED status along with the installation of 1100 tonnes of geothermal capacity. It is unknown when the mall will be constructed and completed due to several delays.

Transportation access

The new mall along with Pacific Mall are located at the major intersection of Steeles Avenue and Kennedy Road. They are served by both the TTC (43 Kennedy and 53 Steeles East) and York Region Transit (8 Kennedy) buses, and located within walking distance from Milliken GO Station. The two entrance roads of the malls are Redlea Avenue and Clayton Drive. The railway crossing is being upgraded as an underpass which will eliminate traffic tieups along Steeles.

References

External links

Official website

Shopping malls in the Regional Municipality of York
Buildings and structures in Markham, Ontario
Tourist attractions in Markham, Ontario